Le Progrès Egyptien is a French-language Egyptian daily newspaper.

History and profile
Le Progrès Egyptien was established in 1893. It is owned by Al Gomhuria, a pro-government newspaper in Egypt. The paper is based in Cairo and the publisher is Dar Al Tahrir Publishing and Printing company.

References

External links
 Le Progrès Egyptien

1893 establishments in Egypt
Daily newspapers published in Egypt
French-language newspapers published in Egypt
Newspapers published in Cairo
Newspapers established in 1893
State media